The 18 kilometre cross-country skiing event was part of the cross-country skiing at the 1924 Winter Olympics programme. The competition was held on Saturday, 2 February 1924. Forty-one cross-country skiers from twelve nations competed.

Medalists

Results

The competition began at 9:30 a.m. with the first starter Antonín Gottstein. The last starter was Ragnar Omtvedt at 9:55:30 a.m. The first finisher was Tapani Niku at 10:51:56 a.m. and the event ended with the last finisher, who was again Ragnar Omtvedt at 12:00:33 p.m.

so=Starting order, the second competitor started one minute after the first, then all others starter within 30 seconds.

References

External links
Official Olympic Report
 

Men's 18 kilometre
Men's 18 kilometre cross-country skiing at the Winter Olympics